Mucronea californica is a rare species of annual plant in the family Polygonaceae known by the common names California spineflower or California mucronea. An ephemeral plant found growing in the sandy microhabitats of coastal sage scrub, chaparral and dunes, this plant is threatened by the urbanization and development of its viable habitat and has been locally extirpated over much of its range. It has small, white to pink flowers that top inflorescences spined with awns.

Description 
An ephemeral annual plant, this species grows narrow leaves from a rosette, and develops a spiny, awn-covered inflorescence with white to pink flowers on the top.

Morphology 

The inflorescence is cyme-like. There are 3 bracts, which are spreading to nearly erect, and are connate for half of their length, shaped triangular to ovate or oblong.

The involucres are 3-angled and obscurely ribbed, with 3 teeth. Flowering is from March to August. The singular flowers have a perianth  large, pubescent near the base on the lower surface. The tepals are oblong, with an entire apex. There are 6 to 9 stamens. The fruits are achenes .

Distribution and habitat 
This species is endemic to California, and is found mostly on the Pacific Coast ranging from San Luis Obispo south to San Diego County, along with a number of locations inland from Monterey County to western Riverside County. It is found along sandy openings in a variety of habitats, from coastal sage scrub, chaparral communities, and dunes to sandy substrates in grasslands and pine-oak woodlands. It is threatened and in substantial decline from the extensive urbanization in southern California, which has made it locally extirpated over much of its historical range.

Gallery

References

External links 

 
 Gallery on CalPhotos
 USDA Plants Profile

Endemic flora of California
Natural history of the California chaparral and woodlands
Taxa named by George Bentham
Plants described in 1836
Polygonaceae